The Progressive Leadership Alliance of Nevada (PLAN) is a non-partisan, non-profit organization.

PLAN was founded in 1994 to bring together diverse and potentially competing organizations into one cohesive force for transformational change in Nevada. PLAN has grown from its 12 founding groups to a current membership of 30 organizations that include anti-poverty activists, children's advocates, people with disabilities, environmentalists, gay and transgender people, labor unions, people of color, and women.

PLAN uses research, public education, leadership development and grassroots organizing to build power and create more humane solutions to Nevada’s problems. PLAN’s mission is to build collective strategic action among coalition partners in order to deepen democracy and achieve greater social justice in Nevada.

In addition, PLAN assists its member groups to build power through working together to bridge differences of class, race, immigration status, gender, gender identity, sexual orientation and region. PLAN provides a combination of training, technical assistance and financial resources designed to mobilize a broad, diverse, power base

PLAN has offices in Carson City, Las Vegas and Reno.

PLAN’s structure
State director
Northern coordinator
Southern coordinator
Communications director
Field director
Technology director
Finance director
Community Organizers

History

PLAN Projects

Racial Equity Report Card
PLAN partners with Western States Center to produce a Racial Equality Report Card (RERC) while Nevada’s legislature is in session.

The RERC examines legislation introduced during each session of Nevada’s legislature. It grades each chamber of the state legislature separately, as well as the Governor, on their responses to bills graded for the report card.

Nevada Fair Mining Tax
Nevadans for Fair Mining Taxes is a coalition dedicated to ensuring a stable and equitable revenue source for our state by undoing antebellum Constitutional provisions which allow the mining industry to evade paying its fair share of taxes. PLAN supported Question 2 in the 2014 election, which would have removed a cap in the state constitution on mining taxes. The measure was defeated by a less than 1% margin.

TransForm Nevada
This group was formed in an effort to pass Assembly Bill 211; Nevada's trans-inclusive Employment Non-Discrimination Act. The National Gay and Lesbian Task Force provided training and support to TransForm Nevada to strategize around field efforts, grow their team of activists, and increase volunteer leadership

PLAN Member Organizations

AFSCME Local 4041

Committee to Aid Abused Women

Culinary Workers Local 226

Family Ties of Nevada

Food Bank of Northern Nevada

Gay and Lesbian Community Center of Southern Nevada

Great Basin Resource Watch

Great Basin Water Network

Human Services Network

National Association of Social Workers - Nevada Chapter

Nevada Conservation League

Nevada Justice Association

Nevada Lawyers for Progressive Policy

Nevada NOW

Nevada Partnership for Homeless Youth

Nevada State Education Association

Nevada Women’s Lobby

People of Color Caucus

Planned Parenthood Mar Monte

Planned Parenthood of Southern Nevada

ProgressNow Nevada

Reno-Sparks Indian Colony

Reno-Sparks NAACP

SEIU Local 1107

Sierra Club - Toiyabe Chapter

Sierra Interfaith Action for Peace

Sunrise Sustainable Resources Group

TRENDZ

Unitarian Universalist Congregation of Las Vegas

Unitarian Universalist Social Action Committee - Reno

Washoe Legal Services

References 

Politics of Nevada